Baine may refer to:

Baine Harbour (2006 population: 134), Canadian community in the province of Newfoundland and Labrador
The baïne, a geographical phenomenon unique to the Aquitaine coast of France
Baine Kerr (1919–2008), American lawyer
James Baine (1710–1790), a minister of the second great secession from the Church of Scotland

See also
Bain (disambiguation)
Bane (disambiguation)
Baines
Baynes
Bains (disambiguation)